Avenida Scalabrini Ortiz is an avenue that runs through Villa Crespo and Palermo neighborhoods of Buenos Aires, Argentina, and goes from southwest to northeast, parallel Avenida Juan B. Justo. It starts at Avenida Warnes, and ends at Avenida Figueroa Alcorta.

History 
In 1867, when this avenue was still a dirt track, it was named El Camino del Ministro Inglés (English Minister's Road), because the English diplomat Henry Southern used it to go downtown from the country house where he lived with his family.

A decree on November 27, 1893, changed its name for the first time to Canning, as a tribute to George Canning, former Secretary of Foreign Relations of the United Kingdom.

Another decree, dictated on May 31, 1974, by the government of Juan Perón, stated that Canning Avenue changed its name into the present one as a tribute to Raúl Scalabrini Ortiz, Argentine journalist, nationalist writer and essayist.

Two years later, during the military dictatorship, the name of this avenue was changed again into Canning Avenue. Ultimately, with the return of democracy, Canning was again renamed to Raúl Scalabrini Ortiz, by a December 29, 1985, ordinance.

Scalabrini Ortiz